Zalog pri Škocjanu is a small village west of Škocjan in the traditional region of Lower Carniola in southeastern Slovenia. Within the Municipality of Škocjan, it belongs to the Local Community of Škocjan. The Municipality of Škocjan is part of the Southeast Slovenia Statistical Region.

Name
The name of the settlement was changed from Zalog to Zalog pri Škocjanu in 1953.

References

External links
Zalog pri Škocjanu at Geopedia

Populated places in the Municipality of Škocjan